Valerio Piva (born 5 July 1958) is an Italian former racing cyclist who currently works as a directeur sportif for UCI WorldTeam . He rode in the 1990 Tour de France and in five editions of the Giro d'Italia.

Major results 
1980
 2nd GP Capodarco
1981
 1st Stage 5 Giro Ciclistico d'Italia
1982
 9th Overall Setmana Catalana de Ciclisme
1983
 7th Overall Giro di Sardegna
 10th Gent–Wevelgem
1987
 2nd Trofeo Laigueglia
 9th Grand Prix Pino Cerami
1991
 5th GP Rik Van Steenbergen

Grand Tour general classification results timeline

References

External links
 

1958 births
Living people
Italian male cyclists
Cyclists from the Province of Mantua